German International School Doha (GIS Doha) is a German international school in Al Mamoura, Doha, Qatar. It serves Kindergarten through grade 11, and it was established in October 2008.

References

External links
 German International School Doha 
 German International School Doha 

International schools in Qatar
Schools in Doha
Doha